Anne Barrington (born 8 April 1953) is an Irish diplomat. She served as Irish ambassador to Japan and represented the Government of Ireland as a Special Envoy to the United Nations as part of Ireland's successful bid to join the UN Security Council for 2021 and 2022.

Career 
Barrington served as an Ambassador in Tanzania, Kenya and Burundi. She was Ambassador in Japan during the 60th anniversary of diplomatic relations between the countries in 2016. She was a Joint-Secretary to the North/South Ministerial Council, a body set-up by the Good Friday Agreement.
In 2022, Barrington chaired the shared island research unit in the Department of the Taoiseach.

References

External links
Ambassador profile at DFA.ie

Irish women ambassadors
Ambassadors of Ireland to Tanzania
Ambassadors of Ireland to Kenya
Ambassadors of Ireland to Japan
1953 births
Living people
Place of birth missing (living people)